Mauro Monz (born June 19, 1974) is a former American football player and coach.  He served as the head football coach a West Virginia University Institute of Technology  in Montgomery, West Virginia from 2003 to 2004, compiling a record of 5–17.

References

External links
 Youngstown State profile
 Duquesne profile

1974 births
Living people
Akron Zips football coaches
American football defensive backs
Duquesne Dukes football coaches
Duquesne Dukes football players
Pittsburgh Panthers football coaches
Robert Morris Colonials football coaches
West Virginia Tech Golden Bears football coaches
Youngstown State Penguins football coaches
High school football coaches in Pennsylvania
Robert Morris University alumni
Sportspeople from Pittsburgh
Players of American football from Pittsburgh